Peter Weatherley (1930–2015) was a British film editor. He also worked on several episodes of the Hammer House of Horror and Hammer House of Mystery and Suspense television series.

Selected filmography
 The Fur Collar (1962)
 Stranglehold (1963)
 The Desperate Ones (1967)
 The Limbo Line (1968)
 The Anniversary (1968)
 A Severed Head (1970)
 Scrooge (1970)
 The Reckoning (1970)
 Blood from the Mummy's Tomb (1971)
 Fear in the Night (1972)
 Alice's Adventures in Wonderland (1972)
 The Hireling (1973)
 Out of Season (1975)
 The Stick Up (1977)
 Alien (1979)
 Rising Damp (1980)
 George and Mildred (1980)
 Enigma (1982)
 The Boys in Blue (1982)

References

Bibliography 
 Fellner, Chris. The Encyclopedia of Hammer Films. Rowman & Littlefield, 2019.

External links 
 

1930 births
2015 deaths
British film editors
People from London